Andrzej Eliasz is a Polish psychologist, professor, and former rector of the SWPS University of Humanities and Social Sciences (1996-2016). Chairman of the board of trustees.

Eliasz was born in 1941. He earned his first undergraduate degree from Warsaw University. In 1972 he obtained a doctoral degree. In 1990 he was awarded the title of professor of humanities. Eliasz worked at the Central Institute for Labor Protection and the Institute of Psychology of the Polish Academy of Sciences.

Awards 
In 2011 Andrzej Eliasz was awarded the Officer's Cross of the Order of Polonia Restituta.

References

Polish psychologists
20th-century births
Academic staff of SWPS University
University of Warsaw alumni
Polish educators
1941 births
Living people